Home, also referred to as The Home Show, is a daytime informational talk show which aired on ABC from 1988 to 1994.

The program was co-hosted by Robb Weller and Sandy Hill during the first season.

Gary Collins hosted the show for the remainder of its run. Co-hosts included Cristina Ferrare, Dana Fleming, Beth Ruyak and Sarah Purcell.  Decorating and craft segments were frequently presented by Hanala Sagal aka Suzan Stadner, Fitness Expert and Sally Marshall, Dian Thomas, Carol Duvall and Kitty Bartholomew. Marc Summers and Wil Shriner presented segments on the latest in technology (computers, home gaming, etc.).

The show's various directors were Arthur Forrest (who directed the pilot), Booey Kober, Bob Loudin, Jerry Kupcinet, Paul Forrest and Bob Levy.

Mother Love joined the show as the announcer in the final season, replacing Bob Hilton.

Broadcast history
The series began as a half-hour program on January 18, 1988; reruns of Mr. Belvedere filled the four-month long gap between the cancelation of game show Bargain Hunters and the premiere of Home. After a 60-minute trial run in September 1988, it expanded permanently to an hour in January 1989 (upon the cancellation of Ryan's Hope), with reruns of Growing Pains moving from 11:00 a.m. to noon Eastern Time. However, some affiliates elected to only carry one half-hour of the program (this practice would carry over later to its successor, Mike and Maty). Home later expanded to 90 minutes and took over the noon slot once Match Game was canceled in 1991. The show reverted to 60 minutes in 1992, after the network officially abandoned the noon time slot to give that half-hour back to local affiliates, which in most cases, preempted the final half-hour in favor of local midday newscasts.

The series was set to be cancelled in 1993, but this decision was reversed after ABC affiliates expressed dissatisfaction with its planned replacement, the importation of The Shirley Show from Canada's CTV, hosted by Shirley Solomon (which would later find a home in American syndication). Several stations, however, eventually placed the series in late night timeslots due to ratings issues or giving priority to local lifestyle or talk shows, such as the (City)'s Talking format seen on several ABC affiliates owned by Hearst Broadcasting. 

On September 24, 1993, during a flu prevention segment featuring medical contributor Dr. Art Ulene, Burbank-based physician Dr. Edward Gilbert, nervously appearing on television for the first time, encouraged vaccination for the season's variant by giving flu shots to the co-hosts live on-air. Gilbert inadvertently administered Collins and Purcell’s respective shots using the same syringe without realizing it until Gilbert remembered just after administering Purcell's vaccine. Afraid the re-used and shared needle might have transmitted a disease between the two hosts, Collins underwent testing for HIV/AIDS and hepatitis immediately after taping the broadcast as a precautionary measure, testing negative for both diseases.

Notwithstanding the temporary reprieve due to the network passing on Shirley, Home aired its last broadcast on April 8, 1994; its time slot would be taken over three days later by Mike and Maty, occupying the hour until its final broadcast on June 7, 1996, to be replaced on June 10 of that year by Caryl & Marilyn: Real Friends. After only a year, the latter series (following a nearly 2½-month run of repeats) was replaced on August 11, 1997 by The View, which occupies the time slot to this day and eventually gained back all clearance from the network's affiliates at its proper time.

(all times ET)

January 1988 – September 1988, 11:30am–12:00pm
September 1988, 11:00am–12:00pm
September 1988 – January 1989, 11:30am–12:00pm
January 1989 – July 1991, 11:00am–12:00pm
July 1991 – August 1992, 11:00am–12:30pm
August 1992 – April 1994, 11:00am–12:00pm

References

External links

1988 American television series debuts
1994 American television series endings
1980s American television talk shows
1990s American television talk shows
American Broadcasting Company original programming
Television series by Fremantle (company)
Television series by 20th Century Fox Television